Idotea balthica is a species of marine isopod which lives on seaweed and seagrass in the subtidal zone of rocky shores and sandy lagoons.

Distribution
Idotea balthica has a broad geographical distribution, having been recorded from the Belgian Exclusive Economic Zone, The British Isles, Cobscook Bay, Dutch Exclusive Economic Zone, European waters, Greek Exclusive Economic Zone, Gulf of Maine, Knokke, North West Atlantic, Red Sea, Voordelta, West Coast of Norway, Wimereux and the Black Sea.

Characteristics
The color of the body is extremely variable, ranging from muted greens to striking black-and-silver patternings; the female is usually darker. The species can be distinguished from other idoteids by the shape of the telson, which is dorsally keeled with straight sides in I. balthica, and has a distinct protrusion at the end.

Foraging
Adults are potentially omnivorous, but mainly feed on different types of vegetation. In the Baltic, these include brown algae (Fucus spp., Elachista fucicola, Pylaiella littoralis), green algae (Cladophora glomerata, Ulva spp.), and Phanerogams (Stuckenia pectinata, Ruppia spp., Zostera marina).

In the Baltic, I. balthica prefers Fucus vesiculosus, an algal seaweed, as host plant over other algae and vascular plants. The apical and basal parts of F. vesiculosus differ as food and as shelter, and males grow faster when fed with the apical parts, but females grow equally well with both.

As a pollinator
In 2022, I. balthica was discovered to help Gracilaria gracilis reproduce – the first known case of an animal helping algae reproduce.

References

External links
 

Valvifera
Crustaceans of the Atlantic Ocean
Crustaceans described in 1772
Taxa named by Peter Simon Pallas